Coffee Prince is a 2007 South Korean television series starring Yoon Eun-hye, Gong Yoo, Lee Sun-kyun, and Chae Jung-an. Based on the novel of the same name written by Lee Sun-mi, it was aired on MBC's Mondays and Tuesdays at the 21:55 (KST) time slot from July 2 and August 28, 2007 consisting of 17 episodes.

The drama portrays the story of an unlikely romance between a tomboyish woman, who dresses like a man in order to get work, and a young food empire mogul. It contains homoerotic elements, as the man does not initially know of the tomboy's true sex. Hailed as a hit for its high ratings, the drama received positive reviews from critics and won multiple awards.

Synopsis

Choi Han-gyeol (Gong Yoo) is the grandson of chairwoman Bang (Kim Young-ok) of Dong-in Foods, a company that has a thriving coffee business. He has never had a job and does not care for responsibility. Han-gyeol is hung up on his first love, Han Yoo-joo (Chae Jung-an), who only sees him as a friend. Go Eun-chan (Yoon Eun-hye) is a 24-year-old tomboy who is often mistaken for a guy. Her father died when she was 16 years old and since then she has taken over as the breadwinner in her family. When Han-gyeol and Eun-chan meet, he, not knowing that she is a girl, decides to hire her to pretend to be his gay lover so that he can escape the blind dates arranged by his grandmother.

After getting an ultimatum from his grandmother, Han-gyeol takes over a rundown old coffee shop, later renamed "Coffee Prince," to prove that he's capable, both to his grandmother and to Yoo-joo. In order to attract female customers, he only hires good-looking male employees. Eun-chan, desperate for money, continues to hide her gender to get a job at Coffee Prince.

Soon, feelings start to develop between Eun-chan and Han-gyeol. As Han-gyeol is unaware that Eun-chan is a woman, he starts to question his sexuality and is thrown into turmoil.

Cast

Main
Yoon Eun-hye as Go Eun-chan 
A cheerful, friendly girl with a large appetite, she works multiple jobs to support her family. With her short haircut, baggy clothes and flat chest, Eun-chan resembles a boy and is often mistaken for one.
Gong Yoo as Choi Han-gyeol
The grandson of chairwoman Bang of Dongin Foods, a company that has a thriving coffee business. He is an intelligent man but is fiercely independent and abhors the thought of being tied down by one career in his life.
Lee Sun-kyun as Choi Han-sung
A talented music producer and cousin of Han-gyeol. Despite being in a complicated romantic relationship with Yoo-joo, he develops feelings for Eun-chan as well.
Chae Jung-an as Han Yoo-joo
Han-gyeol's first love, and Han-sung's ex-girlfriend. She is a talented professional artist who left Han-sung to go to New York with another man, but complicates his life by returning to Korea.

Supporting
Lee Eon as Hwang Min-yeop 
Coffee Prince waiter. Strong and sweet-natured but not very smart, he is slavishly devoted to Eun-sae, who treats him with disdain, and is the first to discover Eun-chan's true gender.
Kim Dong-wook as Jin Ha-rim
Coffee Prince waiter. Outgoing and hot-tempered, he is fond of Eun-chan.
Kim Jae-wook as Noh Sun-ki
Coffee Prince chef. A taciturn half-Japanese heartthrob, he is recruited to make his popular waffles at the cafe.
Kim Chang-wan as Hong Gae-shik
Coffee Prince co-manager. His cafe is failing before Han-gyeol is ordered in to clean it up and relaunch it.
Kim Young-ok as Han-gyeol and Han-sung's grandmother
A stern and powerful woman, she is the head of the family and threatens to withdraw her financial support of Han-gyeol unless he proves he can run a business and be responsible.
Kim Ja-ok as Han-gyeol's mother
Choi Il-hwa as Han-gyeol's father
Han Ye-in as Go Eun-sae
Eun-chan's younger sister. Eun-sae has dreams of becoming a rich and famous music star.
Park Won-sook as Eun-chan's mother
Lee Han-wi as Mr. Ku, a butcher who is infatuated with Eun-chan's mother
Kim Jung-min as DK, Yoo-joo's ex-boyfriend
Ban Hye-ra as Yoo-joo's mother
Choi Eun-seo as Ha Da Young, the girl who wants to learn to make waffles
Nam Myung-ryul as Myung Jae, Han-gyeol's real father
Han Da-min as Han Byul
Yoon Seung-ah as girl playing cards with Han-gyeol on the plane (bit part, ep 1)

Production

Filming locations

Many of the scenes filmed on location in Seoul are as follows:

 The "Coffee Prince" was an old coffee shop in Hongdae area, which was remodeled for the filming. The eponymous cafe was reopened after filming concluded with the wall flowers painting by Han Yoo-joo and other props from the drama on display.
 Seoul Animation Center at the foot of Namsan in Yejang-dong, Jung-gu: The roof top was used as the exterior terrace of Choi Han-gyeol's house. You can see this rooftop garden thoroughly from this scene Coffee Prince, 17회, Sweet Scene
 Yeonhui Matgil (or Yeonhee Street of Flavors), Yeomni-dong in Mapo-gu: the location of the Chinese restaurant where Han-gyeol and Eun-chan ate.
 The jogging course at Palgakjeong on the Bugak Skyway, Pyeongchang-dong, Jongno-gu: Where Han-gyeol goes jogging; and where he met Yoo-joo and Eun-chan who brought competing packed meals for him.
 The interior and exterior of the Gwanghwamun branch of Kyobo Book Centre: Where Han-gyeol buys books on coffee to encourage Eun-chan to become a barista.
 Hongdae Playground (or Hongik Children's Park) in Hongdae area: Where Han-gyeol bought Yoo-joo a hat from a street vendor (along Wausan-ro between the playground and Hongik University).
 Stone wall road between Duksung Girls High School and Pungmoon Girls High School, across the road from the start of Insa-dong Street that runs from Insa-dong to Samcheong-dong in Jongno-gu: Where Han-gyeol helped Eun-chan in the rain, when she encounters a bully on her way home while carrying bags of dolls for sewing work.

In 2011, the Hongdae area and the coffee shop were featured in a National Geographic Channel-produced documentary on the Korean Wave titled Seoul's Got Soul.

Original soundtrack

Ratings

Source: TNS Media Korea

Awards and nominations

International broadcast
It aired in Japan on Fuji TV beginning August 11, 2010 as part of the network's "Hallyu Alpha Summer Festival."

It aired in the Philippines on GMA Network from January 1 to March 19, 2008 and received high ratings during its run. The series was re-aired with English subtitles on Animax Asia in 2010 and on GMA News TV from September 19 to October 14, 2016 at 11:00pm.

It aired in Thailand on Channel 7 beginning April 19, 2008.

The series aired in Malaysia in 2010 on Animax Asia with Malay dub and English subtitles.

It aired in the Middle East on MBC 4 beginning December 8, 2013, dubbed as Makha al amir.

It was dubbed in Tamil and aired in India on Puthuyugam TV beginning October 2014.

It aired in Chile on ETC beginning September 2016.

Remake

In 2012, the TV series was remade in Thailand and the Philippines.

In 2016, a Chinese remake of the series titled Prince Coffee Lab was announced, directed by Kang Shin-hyo of The Heirs.

In 2017, the Malaysian remake of Coffee Prince directed by Michael Ang began airing on Astro Ria starting November 28.

References

External links

  
 
 

MBC TV television dramas
2007 South Korean television series debuts
2007 South Korean television series endings
Korean-language television shows
South Korean romantic comedy television series
South Korean television series remade in other languages
Television series set in restaurants
Works about coffee
Television shows based on South Korean novels